Kadavil Paulose Mar Athanasius was the First Metropolitan of Angamaly Diocese of Malankara Church ordained for the diocese of Kottayam after its formation in 1876 as per the decision of the historic Mulanthuruthy Synod. From 1891 onwards he assumed the additional responsibility of Angamaly. It was during the time of Kadavil Thirumeni the construction of the St. Mary's Church at Thrikkunathu, Aluva was completed. One of the last wishes of the Metropolitan was to start a seminary at Aluva for teaching Syriac and English for clergy as well as for the laity. With this in mind he donated all his remaining properties and assets to the seminary, which he inherited from his family.

On Saturday, 2 November 1907, Kadavil Paulose Mar Athanasius died at the age of 74. His mortal remains were interred in the northern side of the Madbho. Malankara Metropolitan Pulikottil Mor Dionysius Joseph(Dionysious V) led the last rites of the Metropolitan.

The tomb of the Metropolitan was later modified when the church was reconstructed by  Kuttikkatil Paulose Mar Athanasius. The date of demise of  Parumala Thirumeni, who died on November 2, 1902, also falls on the same date of demise of his close associate Kadavil Mor Athanasius Thirumeni.

References

1907 deaths
Syriac Orthodox Church bishops